Aerobiology (from Greek ἀήρ, aēr, "air"; βίος, bios, "life"; and -λογία, -logia) is a branch of biology that studies organic particles, such as bacteria, fungal spores, very small insects, pollen grains and viruses, which are passively transported by the air. Aerobiologists have traditionally been involved in the measurement and reporting of airborne pollen and fungal spores as a service to those with allergies.

The first finding of airborne algae took place in Germany in 1910.

See also
Aeroplankton

References

External links
International Society of Aerobiology 
https://www.knowmold.com/know-your-mold.html

Mycology
Microbiology